This is a list of airlines currently operating in Senegal.

See also
 List of airlines
 List of defunct airlines of Senegal

Senegal
Airlines
Airlines
Senegal